Olof Ask (born March 18, 1982) is a Swedish handballer, currently playing for Danish Handball League side GOG Svendborg. He has previously played for H 43 Lund and LIF Lindesberg in the Swedish top division.

Ask has played 4 matches for the Swedish national handball team.

External links
player info

1982 births
Living people
Swedish male handball players